Abdangsar (also Romanized as Ābdangsar; also known as Ābdangsar-e Lātleyl) is a village in Lat Leyl Rural District, Otaqvar District, Langarud County, Gilan Province, Iran. At the 2006 census, its population was 156, in 45 families.

References 

Populated places in Langarud County